Katie Johnson may refer to:

Katie Johnson (footballer) (born 1994), American-born Mexican footballer
Katie Johnson (English actress) (1878–1957), English actress
Katie Johnson (American actress) (born 1986), American fine art model, dancer and actress
Katie Johnson (secretary) (born 1981), secretary to US president Barack Obama
Katy Johnson, American beauty pageant winner, 1999 Miss Vermont
Katie Johnson v. Donald J. Trump and Jeffrey E. Epstein (2016) (5:16-cv-00797-DMG-KS, United States District Court for the Central District of California, filed April 26, 2016) was the case of child rape filed against Donald Trump and Jeffrey Epstein for their underage sex parties at Epstein's residence in Manhattan in 1994.

See also
Katharine Johnson (disambiguation)